This article documents the 2008–09 season of Dorset football club A.F.C. Bournemouth

League table

Results

League Two

FA Cup

League Cup

Football League Trophy

Players

First-team squad
Includes all players who were awarded squad numbers during the season.

Left club during season

References 

AFC Bournemouth seasons
A.F.C. Bournemouth